Kalruhi also known as Kalroohi, is a village situated in Una district of Himachal Pradesh, India. It is one of the populous village of Himachal Pradesh.

Demographics
The village has a population of 1331 people of which 701 are males and 630 are females according to the 2011 Indian Census.

References

Villages in Una district